The 1994 World Juniors Track Cycling Championships were the 20th annual Junior World Championships for track cycling held in Quito, Ecuador in August 1994.

The Championships had five events for men (Sprint, Points race, Individual pursuit, Team pursuit and 1 kilometre time trial) and two for women (Individual pursuit and Sprint).

Events

Medal table

References

UCI Juniors Track World Championships
1994 in track cycling
1994 in Ecuadorian sport